Tatlatui Provincial Park is a provincial park in British Columbia, Canada, located at the southern end of the Spatsizi Plateau and around the headwaters of the Firesteel River, part of the Finlay-Peace River basin and therefore in the Arctic drainage.  Thutade Lake, at the head of the Firesteel and to the southeast of the park, is considered the ultimate source of the Mackenzie River (via the Finlay and Peace Rivers).

References

Provincial parks of British Columbia
Stikine Country